The AGM-114 Hellfire is an air-to-ground missile (AGM) first developed for anti-armor use, later developed for precision drone strikes against other target types, especially high-value targets. It was originally developed under the name Heliborne laser, fire-and-forget missile, which led to the colloquial name "Hellfire" ultimately becoming the missile's formal name. It has a multi-mission, multi-target precision-strike ability and can be launched from multiple air, sea, and ground platforms, including the MQ-1 Predator and MQ-9 Reaper. The Hellfire missile is the primary  class air-to-ground precision weapon for the armed forces of the United States and many other nations. It has also been fielded on surface platforms in the surface-to-surface and surface-to-air roles.

Description
Most variants are laser-guided, with one variant, the AGM-114L "Longbow Hellfire", being radar-guided. Laser guidance can be provided either from the launcher, such as the nose-mounted opto-electronics of the AH-64 Apache attack helicopter, other airborne target designators or from ground-based observers, the latter two options allowing the launcher to break line of sight with the target and seek cover.

The development of the Hellfire Missile System began in 1974 with the United States Army requirement for a "tank-buster", launched from helicopters to defeat armored fighting vehicles.

The Hellfire II, developed in the early 1990s is a modular missile system with several variants, and entered service with the U.S. Army in 1996. Hellfire II's semi-active laser variants—AGM-114K high-explosive anti-tank (HEAT), AGM-114KII with external blast fragmentation sleeve, AGM-114M (blast fragmentation), and AGM-114N metal augmented charge (MAC)—achieve pinpoint accuracy by homing in on a reflected laser beam aimed at the target. The General Atomics MQ-1 Predator and MQ-9 Reaper unmanned combat aerial vehicles (UCAVs) carry the Hellfire II, but the most common platform is the AH-1Z Viper helicopter gunship, which can carry up to 16 of them. The AGM-114L, or Longbow Hellfire, is a fire-and-forget weapon: equipped with a millimeter-wave (MMW) active radar homing, it requires no further guidance after launch—even being able to lock on to its target after launch—and can hit its target without the launcher or other friendly unit being in line of sight of the target. It also works in adverse weather and battlefield obscurants, such as smoke and fog, which can mask the position of a target or prevent a designating laser from forming a detectable reflection. Each Hellfire weighs , including the  warhead, and has a range of  depending on trajectory.

The AGM-114R "Romeo" Hellfire II entered service in late 2012. It uses a semi-active laser homing guidance system and a K-charge multipurpose warhead to engage targets that formerly needed multiple Hellfire variants. It will replace AGM-114K, M, N, and P variants in U.S. service.

In October 2012, the U.S. ordered 24,000 Hellfire II missiles, for both the U.S. armed forces and foreign customers.

A possible new JCM successor called the Joint Air to Ground Missile (JAGM) is under consideration. Due to budget reductions, JAGM development was separated into increments, with increment 1 focusing on adding a millimeter-wave radar to the Hellfire-R to give it a dual-mode seeker, enabling it to track moving targets in bad weather.

Operational history

In 2009, the British Ministry of Defence (MoD) acknowledged that Army Air Corps (AAC) AgustaWestland Apaches had used AGM-114 Hellfire missiles against Taliban forces in Afghanistan. The MoD stated that 20 missiles were used in 2008 and a further 20 in 2009. In the British Parliament, Liberal Democrat politician Nick Harvey argued that the "Parliament must be reassured these are a weapon of last resort."

AGM-114 Hellfire missiles were used to kill Hamas leader Ahmed Yassin by the Israeli Air Force (IAF) in 2004, and by the US military to kill American-born Islamic cleric Anwar al-Awlaki in Yemen in 2011, Al-Qaeda operative Abu Yahya al-Libi in Pakistan in 2012, al-Shabaab militant Mukhtar Abu Zubair in Somalia in 2014, and British ISIL executioner Mohammed Emwazi (also known as "Jihadi John") in Syria in 2015. They were also used in the assassination of Qasem Soleimani as well as the killing of Ayman al-Zawahiri.

The AGM-114 has occasionally been used as an air-to-air missile. The first operational air-to-air kill with a Hellfire took place on 24 May 2001, after a civilian Cessna 152 aircraft entered Israeli airspace from Lebanon, with unknown intentions and refusing to answer or comply with ATC repeated warnings to turn back. An Israeli Air Force AH-64A Apache helicopter fired on the Cessna, resulting in its complete disintegration. The second operational air-to-air kill with a Hellfire occurred on 10 February 2018, after an Iranian UAV entered Israeli airspace from Syria. An Israeli Air Force AH-64 launched a Hellfire missile at the UAV, successfully destroying it.

In January 2016 The Wall Street Journal reported that one training missile without a warhead was accidentally shipped to Cuba in 2014 after a training mission in Europe; it was later returned. A US official said that this was an inert "dummy" version of the Lockheed system stripped of its warhead, fuse, guidance equipment and motor, known as a "Captive Air Training Missile".

Variants

  AGM-114A
 Produced: 1982–1992
 Target: Armored vehicles
 Range: 
 Guidance:
 Semi-active laser homing (SALH)
 Non-programmable. Analogue autopilot.
 Warhead:  shaped charge HEAT. Unable to penetrate reactive armor.
 Length: 
 Weight: 
 AGM-114B/C
 Produced: 1982–1992
 Target: Armored vehicles, ship-borne targets 
 Range: 
 Guidance:
 Semi-active laser homing (SALH)
 Non-programmable 
 Analogue autopilot 
 Warhead:  shaped charge HEAT. Unable to penetrate reactive armor.
 Length: 
 Weight: 
 AGM-114F/FA Interim Hellfire
 Produced: 1991–1994
 Target: Armored vehicles 
 Range: 
 Guidance:
 Semi-active laser homing (SALH) 
 Non-programmable 
 Analogue autopilot
 Warhead:  shaped charge HEAT. Tandem-charge, can penetrate reactive armor.
 Length: 
 Weight: 
 AGM-114K/K2/K2A Hellfire II
 Produced: since 1993–2018
 Target: All armored targets
 Range: 
 Guidance:
 Semi-active laser homing with electro-optical countermeasures hardening
 Digital autopilot & electronics improvements allow target reacquisition after lost laser lock 	
 Warhead:  tandem shaped charge HEAT
 Length:  	
 Weight: 
 K-2 adds insensitive munitions (IM)
 K-2A adds blast-fragmentation sleeve
 AGM-114L Hellfire LongBow
 Produced: 1995–2005, 2016–
 Target: All armored targets
 Range:  	
 Guidance:
 Fire and forget millimeter-wave (MMW) radar seeker coupled with inertial guidance
 Homing capability in adverse weather and the presence of battlefield obscurants
 Programmable fusing and guidance	
 Warhead:  tandem shaped charge high-explosive anti-tank (HEAT) insensitive munitions (IM) warhead
 Length: 
 Weight: 
 L-7/8A Counter-UAS/counter-littoral variants with proximity fuze and blast-fragmentation sleeve
 AGM-114M Hellfire II (Blast Frag)
 Produced: 1998–2010
 Target: Bunkers, light vehicles, urban (soft) targets and caves	
 Range: 
 Guidance:	
 Semi-active laser homing 
 Delayed and programmable fusing in for hardened targets
 Warhead: Blast fragmentation/incendiary
 Weight: 
 Length: 
 AGM-114N Hellfire (MAC) 
 Produced: 2003–2018
 Target: Buildings, soft-skinned targets, ship-borne targets 
 Range: 
 Guidance:
 Semi-active laser homing
 Millimeter-wave radar seeker
 Warhead: Metal augmented charge (thermobaric), sustained pressure wave with delayed fuse capability
 Weight: 
 Speed: Mach 1.3 (1,600 km/h)
 Diameter: 
 Wingspan: 
 Length: 
 AGM-114P/P+ Hellfire II (For UAS)
 Produced: 2003–2012
 Target: All surface targets 	
 Range: 
 Guidance:	
 Semi-active laser homing 
 Delayed and programmable fusing in for hardened targets
 Warhead: Shaped Charge or Blast Fragmentation
 Weight: 
 Length: 
 Designed for UAV altitudes 
 P-2A adds steel fragmentation sleeve
 P-2B adds tantalum fragmentation sleeve
 P+ Adds enhanced inertial measurement unit (IMU) and software support, many customizations for varying battlefields.
 AGM-114R Hellfire II (Hellfire Romeo)
 Produced: since 2012
 Target: All targets
 Range: 
 Guidance:
 Semi-active laser homing
 Warhead: Multi-function warhead, reduced net explosive weight for low collateral damage (R-9E and R-9H).
 Weight: 
 Speed: Mach 1.3
 Length: 
 Unit Cost: $99,600 (all-up round, 2015 USD)
 M36 Captive Flight Training Missile The M36 is an inert device used for training in the handling of the Hellfire. It includes an operational laser seeker.
 AGM-114R9X The Hellfire R9X is a Hellfire variant with a kinetic warhead with pop-out blades instead of explosives, used against specific human targets. Its lethality is due to 45 kg (100 lb) of dense material with six blades flying at high speed, to crush and cut the targeted person— the R9X has also been referred to as the 'Ninja Missile' and 'Flying Ginsu'. It is intended to reduce collateral damage when targeting specific people. Deployed in secret in 2017, its existence has been public since 2019. This variant was used in the killing in 2017 of Abu Khayr al-Masri, a member of Al-Qaeda's leadership, and in 2019 of Jamal Ahmad Mohammad Al Badawi, accused mastermind of the 2000 USS Cole bombing. The weapon has also been used in Syria, and in Afghanistan against a Taliban commander. It was used twice in 2020 against senior al-Qaeda leaders in Syria; in September 2020 US officials estimated that it had been used in combat around six times.

 Hellfire missiles fired by a Reaper drone were used on 31 July 2022 to kill Ayman al-Zawahiri, the leader of Al-Qaeda, who had formerly been involved in planning the 9/11 and other attacks on US targets. It was reported that the missile hit him on a balcony, causing minimal collateral damage. Reports stress that avoiding other casualties was a priority for the mission, following drone attacks that killed several uninvolved people, attracting much criticism. It is widely thought that the Hellfires were the R9X variant, but a United States Special Operations Command spokesman declined to comment, while confirming that the R9X was "in US Special Operations Command's munitions inventory".

Launch vehicles and systems

Manned helicopters

AH-64 Apache
AH-6
MH-6 Little Bird
AH-1Z Viper
Bell OH-58 Kiowa
Tiger ARH
MH-60R
MH-60S

Fixed-wing aircraft

Beechcraft Super King Air
Cessna AC-208 Combat Caravan
KC-130J Harvest HAWK
 IOMAX Archangel
 AC-130W
 MQ-1 Predator
 MQ-1C Gray Eagle
 MQ-9 Reaper

Vessels

Super Dvora Mk III-class patrol boat, Israel
Freedom-class littoral combat ship
Independence-class littoral combat ship

Ground vehicles
 Stryker, IM-SHORAD variant

Experimental platforms

The system has been tested for use on the Humvee and the Improved TOW Vehicle (ITV). Test shots have also been fired from a C-130 Hercules. Sweden and Norway use the Hellfire for coastal defense and have conducted tests with Hellfire launchers mounted on the Combat Boat 90 coastal assault boat.

The US Navy was evaluating the missile for use on the Freedom-class littoral combat ship and Independence-class littoral combat ship from 2014. The missile was successfully fired from a LCS in early 2017 This system is set to deploy by late 2019.

In 2016 the Longbow Hellfire was tested by the US Army using a 15-tube Multi-Mission Launcher mounted on a Family of Medium Tactical Vehicles (FMTV) truck. The MML is an Army-developed weapon system capable of deploying both surface-to-surface and surface-to-air missiles.

Operators

The following nations use the Hellfire:

See also

 9M120 Ataka
 9K121 Vikhr
 AGM-169 Joint Common Missile
 AGM-176 Griffin
 Barq
 Brimstone (missile)
 Direct Attack Guided Rocket
 HJ-10
 List of missiles
 Mokopa
 Nag (missile)
 PARS 3 LR
 Spike (missile)
 UMTAS
 United States Army Aviation and Missile Command

References

External links

AGM-114 Hellfire —Federation of American Scientists (FAS)
HELLFIRE II Missile—Lockheed Martin
LONGBOW FCR and LONGBOW HELLFIRE Missile—Lockheed Martin
Designation Systems
Global Security
Archived copy of Navy Fact File
Janes.com
Hellfire Detailed Description and Images 

AGM-114
AGM-114
Anti-tank guided missiles of the Cold War
Articles containing video clips
Thermobaric weapons
Military equipment introduced in the 1980s
Fire-and-forget weapons
Lockheed Martin